Great Britain, represented by the British Olympic Association (BOA), competed at the 2014 Winter Olympics in Sochi, Russia, from 7 to 23 February 2014. The British team was made up of athletes from the whole United Kingdom including Northern Ireland, whose athletes may have elected to hold Irish citizenship, allowing them to represent either Great Britain or Ireland. Additionally some British overseas territories competed separately from Britain in Olympic competition. A total of 56 athletes competed in 11 sports making it the biggest contingent that Great Britain had sent to a Winter Olympic Games for twenty-six years.

On 9 February 2014, Jenny Jones won Great Britain's first medal on snow in their Winter Olympic history after finishing third in the women's slopestyle.

On 14 February 2014, Lizzy Yarnold won gold in the skeleton. She became the second Briton to win the gold in the event, taking the title from previous Great Britain champion Amy Williams. She was elected to be the flag bearer for the closing ceremony.

On 20 February 2014, the women's curling team won their bronze medal match against Switzerland 6–5. In doing so, they ensured that Great Britain met its UK Sport medal target of three medals from the Games.

On 19 February 2014, the men's curling team won their semifinal against Sweden 6–5 and on 21 February 2014, they won the silver medal after being defeated by Canada in the gold medal match 9–3, but the result still confirmed Great Britain's most successful Olympics for ninety years by equaling the medal count of the 1924 Winter Olympics.

In November 2017, the Russian Bobsleigh teams that came first and fourth in the Four-man event were disqualified. This meant that Great Britain (who originally finished 5th) would move up into the bronze medal position. The IOC requested that the IBSF modify the results, and the medals were redistributed accordingly.

Records

Olympic records
On 11 February Great Britain matched an Olympic scoreline record by beating USA 12–3 in women's curling. They also set a new Olympic record by scoring seven points in a single end. On 14 February they equalled the scoreline record again, this time beating Japan 12–3.

Medallists

Medal and performance targets
On 16 January 2014, the funding body UK Sport announced their medal targets for Team GB at the 2014 Winter Olympic Games in Sochi with the target to win three medals with the best chance of success with the ladies skeleton events. Although the target was set at three medals the funding body predicted that Great Britain had the potential to win as many as seven medals, although this total was not widely expected to be reached. Other realistic chances of medal success were with the bobsleigh and curling events.

The games proved to be highly successful for Team GB, exceeding the initial target of three medals and achieving all of the targets for each of the winter sports that were set.

UK Sport funding
In the Winter Olympic Cycle running from 2010 to 2014 the UK government body UK Sport allocated a then record budget of over £13 million to fund Team GB for the individual athletes as well as the bobsleigh and curling teams for the 2014 Winter Olympics in Sochi. The sports receiving the highest funding were bobsleigh, curling and skeleton, whilst speed skating, ski and snowboard, and figure skating also received funding, but all other winter sports where British athletes were competing did not receive any funding from the body.

Alpine skiing

According to the quota allocation released on 27 January 2014, Great Britain qualified two athletes in alpine skiing.

Biathlon

Based on their performance at the 2012 and 2013 Biathlon World Championships, Great Britain qualified 1 man and 1 woman.

Bobsleigh

* – Denotes the driver of each sled
** – John Baines replaced original selection Craig Pickering who withdrew during the Games with a back injury.
*** – Andrew Matthews replaced original selection Craig Pickering who withdrew during the Games with a back injury.
 In November 2017, the Russian teams that finished 1st and 4th were disqualified by the IOC following the publication of the McLaren Report. This subsequently led to the teams in 2nd, 3rd and 5th being moved up into the medal positions. The IOC requested that the IBSF modify the results, and the medals were redistributed accordingly.

Cross-country skiing

According to the quota allocation released on 30 December 2013, Great Britain had four athletes in qualification position.

Distance

Sprint

Curling

Based on results from 2012 and the 2013, Great Britain has qualified their men's and women's team (consisting of five athletes) as one of the seven highest ranked nations.

Men's tournament

Team

Standings

Round-robin
Great Britain had a bye in draws 4, 7 and 11.

Draw 1

Draw 2

Draw 3

Draw 5

Draw 6

Draw 8

Draw 9

Draw 10

Draw 12

Tiebreaker

Playoffs
Semifinal

Final

Women's tournament

Team

Standings

Round-robin
Great Britain has a bye in draws 2, 6 and 10.

Draw 1

Draw 3

Draw 4

Draw 5

Draw 7

Draw 8

Draw 9

Draw 11

Draw 12

Playoffs
Semifinal

Bronze medal game

Figure skating

On 11 December 2013 the British Olympic Association announced the figure skaters taking part in the Sochi 2014 Olympics:

Team trophy

Freestyle skiing

After suffering injuries and a loss of consciousness as a result of an accident during training on 17 February, it was decided that Rowan Cheshire would not compete in the women's halfpipe event, which began just three days later.

Short track speed skating

Based on their performance at the two World Cup events in November 2013, Great Britain qualified 3 men and 2 women.

The team for GB was named on 16 December 2013.

Men

Women

Qualification legend: ADV – Advanced due to being impeded by another skater; FA – Qualify to medal round; FB – Qualify to consolation round

Skeleton

Snowboarding

Freestyle

Qualification Legend: QF – Qualify directly to final; QS – Qualify to semifinal

Snowboard cross

Qualification legend: FA – Qualify to medal final; FB – Qualify to consolation final

See also
Great Britain at the 2014 Summer Youth Olympics
Great Britain at the 2014 Winter Paralympics

References

External links 

 

2014
Nations at the 2014 Winter Olympics
Winter Olympics